Soe Min Naing (born 1 July 1990) is a footballer from Burma. He plays for Yangon United F.C. and Myanmar national football team. Soe made his national team debut on 30 March 2015 against Indonesia.

References

1990 births
Living people
People from Magway Division
Burmese footballers
Myanmar international footballers
Association football forwards
Magway FC players